Daniel Kaiser may refer to:

 Dan Kaiser (born 1980), American politician
 Daniel Kaiser (footballer) (born 1990), German footballer
 Daniel Kaiser (soccer) (born 2000), Canadian soccer player
 Daniel Kaiser (wrestler) (fl. 1920s), Swiss wrestler